Mossley Hollins High School is a coeducational secondary school located in Mossley, in the borough of Tameside, Greater Manchester. The school's original building was opened in the 1960s. Mossley Hollins ranked eighth in Tameside in the most recent league table of school GCSE performance.  The school received a rating of "Outstanding" in an Ofsted report made in 2014.

The Department for Education stated that the academic performance of students at Mossley Hollins was amongst the best in England with the GCSE results in English in 2014 placing them in the top 2% of schools nationally.

The school has a new £20 million building which opened to pupils on Wednesday, March 2, 2011.

References

Secondary schools in Tameside
Community schools in Tameside